Audichya Brahmins are a Hindu Brahmin sub-caste mainly from the Indian state of Gujarat. They are the most numerous Brahmin community in Gujarat. A minority of them reside in the Indian state of Rajasthan.

The word "Audichya" means Northern in Sanskrit. This became the caste name because they claim ancestry from the gangetic planes of the present state of Uttar Pradesh (UP) and moved to Gujarat during the rule of Patan's king Siddharaj Jayasinh in 11th century AD. They were invited by the king for priestly duties at Rudramahal in Patan.

Classification
The caste is divided into two endogamous groups, the Sahasra and the Tolakia. In a census in 1883, the sahasra were numerically a much bigger community than the Tolakia. The sahasra are further subdivided into the Zalawadi, Sihora and Sidhpora groups. The community is at times also differentiated by their geographical location they came from, for example, Marwadi audichya, Kutch audichya or Wagadia audichya. Other differentiation is by the caste that retains them as purohit (family priest) for rituals, for example Darji-gor, Mochi-gor, Kanbi-gor, Koli-gor, Charan- gor, Raj-gor in Saurashtra and northern Gujarat. The Parajia sub-group of Audichya Brahmins worked as hereditory purohitas of Charanas around Junagarh.

Society and culture
In the past, since the Sidhpora sub-caste was considered higher in social ranking, other audichya groups considered it a point of honor to offer their daughters in marriage to Sidhpora men. In the past this custom led to polygamy amongst the Sidhpora group. During the British colonial rule, the caste was one of the first Gujarati community to take up western education. The community along with the Bhatia also were the first to form a caste association. The caste association's aim was mutual help and support for members in the cities and to promote education.

References

Brahmins
Priestly castes
Gujarati people
Social groups of Gujarat
Brahmin communities of Gujarat